Drew Docherty (born 19 November 1965) is a Scottish former boxer who was British champion at both bantamweight (1992–1997) and super bantamweight (1999). Married to Caroline Bradshaw and has two children.

Career
Born in Glasgow and based in Condorrat, Docherty represented Scotland as an amateur, and made his professional debut in September 1989 with a points win over Gordon Shaw. Unbeaten in his first 8 fights, in June 1992 he stopped defending champion Joe Kelly in the fifth round to become British bantamweight champion. He made a successful defence in January 1993 against Donnie Hood.

In February 1994 he made an unsuccessful attempt at Vincenzo Belcastro's European title at the Kelvin Hall, losing a unanimous points decision. In November he made a second successful defence of his British title against Adey Benton, and in February 1995 challenged for Alfred Kotey's WBO World bantamweight title, the defending champion stopping him in the fourth round.

In October 1995 Docherty made the third defence of his British title against James Murray. Murray collapsed in the twelfth of sheer exhaustion in the final round and Docherty won the Lonsdale Belt outright, but Murray required brain surgery and died the next day. Docherty considered quitting boxing and sought counselling but decided to fight on.

Docherty returned in January 1996 to challenge WBO champion Daniel Jiménez, but was again unsuccessful with the unanimous decision going to Jiminez. Two months later Docherty attempted to win the European bantamweight title, but was stopped in the third round by defending champion Johnny Bredahl. He was due to defend his British title against Paul Lloyd in October 1997 but a knee ligament injury caused the fight to be called off and Docherty was controversially stripped of the title he had held for more than five years. Lloyd went on to take the title, and in September 1998 Docherty faced him at the Barbican Centre in York with Lloyd's Commonwealth title also at stake; LLoyd won on points to retain both titles, with referee Roy Francis scoring it 118-113.

Docherty then moved up to super bantamweight and in April 1999 beat Patrick Mullings to become British champion at a second weight. In October that year he challenged unsuccessfully for Michael Brodie's European title at the York Hall, Bethnal Green. Having relinquished the British title he attempted to regain it from Michael Alldis in November 2000, but was knocked out in the sixth round, and subsequently retired from boxing.

Drew's younger brother Wilson Docherty was also a boxer, winning the World Boxing Board featherweight title in 1994 and going on to fight for British and Commonwealth titles.

Professional boxing record

References

External links
 

1965 births
Living people
Scottish male boxers
Bantamweight boxers
Super-bantamweight boxers
Boxers from Glasgow
Sportspeople from North Lanarkshire